Sérgio Miguel Hora Ribeiro (born 18 January 1996) is a Portuguese professional footballer who plays as a winger.

Career

Club
On 24 May 2015, Ribeiro made his professional debut with Porto B in a 2014–15 Segunda Liga match against Marítimo B. He went onto make 28 appearances and score 2 goals for Porto B between 2015 and 2017. On 31 January 2017, Ribeiro joined Primeira Liga side Vitória Guimarães. His first involvement with Vitória was with the club's reserve team, as he was an unused substitute in a LigaPro game versus Portimonense on 15 February.

International
Ribeiro has represented Portugal at various youth levels, including U17 and U19 level.

Honours

Club
Porto B
LigaPro (1): 2015–16

References

External links

Stats and profile at LPFP 
National team data 

1996 births
Sportspeople from Vila Nova de Gaia
Living people
Portuguese footballers
Association football wingers
Liga Portugal 2 players
FC Porto B players
Vitória S.C. players
Vitória S.C. B players
Portugal youth international footballers
U.D. Oliveirense players
Liga II players
FC Universitatea Cluj players
Portuguese expatriate footballers
Portuguese expatriate sportspeople in Romania
Expatriate footballers in Romania